Anna Palaiologina (died 1320) was a Byzantine princess and queen-consort (basilissa) of the Despotate of Epirus.

She was a daughter of the Byzantine co-emperor Michael IX Palaiologos and his wife, Rita of Armenia. Already in 1304, her hand was sought by the Epirote regent, Anna Palaiologina Kantakouzene, for her son Thomas I Komnenos Doukas; the marriage eventually took place in ca. 1307. When Thomas was murdered by his nephew, Nicholas Orsini, in 1318, the latter took Anna as his wife. She died in 1320.

References

Sources
 

13th-century births
1320 deaths
Consorts of Epirus
Anna
Greek women of the Byzantine Empire
14th-century Byzantine people
14th-century Byzantine women
Daughters of Byzantine emperors